Misty Daniels is an American stage actress with over 20 years of experience in acting. She is a native of Pikeville, Kentucky and has performed locally for the Jenny Wiley Theatre in around 40 productions, including Disney's Beauty in the Beast, The Wizard of Oz, and My Fair Lady. She has also performed in such locations as New York City, Nashville, Philadelphia, and Florida and has done a variety of other works besides stage acting such as voiceovers, commercial work, and studio recording.

Her most notable voice role is Sae Sawanoguchi in the anime series Magic User's Club, which she was nominated in the American Anime Awards for "Best Actress in a Comedy".

References

External links

Living people
People from Pikeville, Kentucky
American stage actresses
American voice actresses
Year of birth missing (living people)
Actresses from Kentucky
21st-century American women